Jean Watson (born 29 October 1960) is a British cross-country skier. She competed in two events at the 1988 Winter Olympics.

References

External links
 

1960 births
Living people
British female cross-country skiers
Olympic cross-country skiers of Great Britain
Cross-country skiers at the 1988 Winter Olympics
Sportspeople from County Durham